Dedi Iman (born July 22, 1985) is an Indonesian footballer who plays for Barito Putera in the Indonesia Super League.

References

1985 births
Living people
Liga 1 (Indonesia) players
PS Barito Putera players
Indonesian footballers
Association football goalkeepers
Sportspeople from Surabaya
21st-century Indonesian people